Lactiferous ducts are ducts that converge and form a branched system connecting the nipple to the lobules of the mammary gland. When lactogenesis occurs, under the influence of hormones, the milk is moved to the nipple by the action of smooth muscle contractions along the ductal system to the tip of the nipple. They are also referred to as galactophores, galactophorous ducts, mammary ducts, mamillary ducts or milk ducts.

Structure
Lactiferous ducts are lined by a columnar epithelium supported by myoepithelial cells. Prior to 2005, it was thought within the areola the lactiferous duct would dilate to form the lactiferous sinus in which milk accumulates between breastfeeding sessions. However past studies have shown that the lactiferous sinus does not exist.

Function
The columnar epithelium plays a key role in balancing milk production, milk stasis and reabsorption. The cells of the columnar epithelium form tight junctions which are regulated by hormones and local factors like pressure and casein content. Prolactin and/or placental lactogen are required for tight junction closure while progesterone is the main hormone preventing closure before birth.

Clinical significance
The majority of breast diseases either originate from lactiferous ducts or are closely related. The high susceptibility to benign and malignant diseases is in part a consequence of the cycling hormonal growth stimulation resulting in a high cell turnover and accumulation of defects and complicated hormonal equilibrium which is highly sensitive to disturbance. 
 most breast cancers arise from the ductal epithelium (see ductal carcinoma in situ)
 phyllodes tumor and intraductal papilloma of the breast
 mastalgia is frequently caused by an imbalance of breast secretion in the lobules and resorption in the ducts
 nonpuerperal mastitis is frequently caused by a similar mechanism in combination with an infection
 duct ectasia is similar and overlapping with the above mentioned
 subareolar abscess and squamous metaplasia of lactiferous ducts
 most forms of fibrocystic breast changes and cysts are thought to originate from lactiferous ducts

Lactiferous Duct Dysmorphia (LDD)
Lactiferous Duct Dysmorphia (LDD) is the deformity or abnormality in the shape or size of a milk duct negatively affecting milk flow (also known as Milk Duct Dysmorphia). Typical causes include: nipple clamps, piercings, or most commonly, ill fitting breast pump flanges.

See also
Lactation
Breastfeeding
Blocked milk duct

References

Breast anatomy
Human female endocrine system